Lisette Lanvin (1913–2004) was a French film actress.

Selected filmography
 Student's Hotel (1932)
 Youth (1933)
 Nitchevo (1936)
 Jenny (1936)
 The Kings of Sport (1937)
 The Club of Aristocrats (1937)
 A Woman of No Importance (1937)
 The Pearls of the Crown (1937)
 Orage (1938)

References

Bibliography
 Goble, Alan. The Complete Index to Literary Sources in Film. Walter de Gruyter, 1999.

External links

1913 births
2004 deaths
French film actresses
20th-century French women